Raamsdonksveer is a town in the Dutch municipality of Geertruidenberg, North Brabant. It lies on the east side of the Donge opposite Geertruidenberg. It is a regional center of commerce and industry. Raamsdonksveer lies between Oosterhout and Hank

History 
The village was first mentioned between 1649 and 1672 as "'t Ransdoncx Veer", and means the ferry of Raamsdonk. Raamsdonksveer developed around the ferry over the Donge which formed part of the road from Dordrecht to Breda.

In 1336, the Carthusian monastery Het Hollandse Huis was founded near the village. It was destroyed during the Reformation at the end of the 16th century. The Dutch Reformed church is an aisleless church in Gothic Revival style which was built in 1860. The former water tower was built in 1925. In 1988, office buildings were added near the base of the tower.

Raamsdonksveer was home to 1,856 people in 1840. On 1886, a railway station opened on the Langstraat Line (Lage Zwaluwe to 's-Hertogenbosch). It was closed in 1950.

Raamsdonksveer was part of the municipality of Raamsdonk until 1996, when it was merged into Geertruidenberg.

Gallery

References

Populated places in North Brabant
Geertruidenberg